Gregory James Smith (born July 18, 1955) is a Canadian former ice hockey player. He played for five teams in the National Hockey League between 1976 and 1988. Internationally Smith represented the Canadian national team at the 1977 and 1979 World Championships.

Career 
A stay-at-home defenceman who was selected by the California Golden Seals in the 1975 NHL Draft, Smith followed the franchise when it relocated to Cleveland in 1976, and when it folded in 1978 and merged with the Minnesota North Stars, where his rights were protected by the North Stars in the 1978 Cleveland-Minnesota Dispersal Draft. He played for Minnesota for three seasons, and his solid defensive play would help guide them to the finals in 1981.

Smith was traded to the Detroit Red Wings where he played for parts of five seasons until he was traded to the Washington Capitals at the trade deadline of the 1985–86 NHL season. He played for the Capitals until his retirement at the end of the 1987–88 NHL season.

Retirement 
Smith spent much of his retirement in Billings, Montana, raising his family and coaching hockey. He has helped several players get into various Junior hockey leagues in both the US and Canada.

Family life 
Smith currently resides in Billings, Montana with his wife.

Career statistics

Regular season and playoffs

International

References

External links

Profile at hockeydraftcentral.com

1955 births
Living people
Calgary Cowboys draft picks
California Golden Seals draft picks
California Golden Seals players
Canadian expatriate ice hockey players in the United States
Canadian ice hockey defencemen
Cleveland Barons (NHL) players
Colorado College Tigers men's ice hockey players
Detroit Red Wings players
Ice hockey people from Alberta
Minnesota North Stars players
People from Ponoka, Alberta
Salt Lake Golden Eagles (CHL) players
Washington Capitals players